This is a list of ice hockey teams in Alberta. It features the leagues they have played for, and championships won.

Since hockey was introduced to Alberta, Canada, in the 1890s, teams at all levels have come and gone.  While the professional ranks have been confined to the major cities of Calgary and Edmonton, partially due to geographical isolation from the major eastern and Pacific coast population centres, both junior and senior teams thrive across the province.

Alberta is home to two National Hockey League teams, five Western Hockey League teams, the 16-team Alberta Junior Hockey League, and five Junior B hockey leagues comprising over 50 teams. The Canadian Women's Hockey League is represented in Alberta, as are teams competing at the senior, university and college ranks.

This list does not include teams below the junior age group, or adult teams below Senior AA.
Major professional

National Hockey League
The Edmonton Oilers became the first National Hockey League team in Alberta as a result of the NHL–WHA merger. The Calgary Flames arrived from Atlanta the following year.

Western Canada Hockey League
The Western Canada Hockey League was the first major-professional league on the prairies. Founded in 1921, it collapsed due to escalating costs in 1926, and was reformed as the Prairie Hockey League from 1926 to 1928.

*Includes 1926–27 championship after league was renamed the Prairie Hockey League.

World Hockey Association
The World Hockey Association had envisioned that franchises in Calgary and Edmonton would create an effective rivalry. When the Calgary Broncos were unable to start their inaugural season, the Oilers were briefly renamed the Alberta Oilers with the intention of splitting games between the two cities. This plan failed to materialize.

Minor professional

American Hockey League
The Edmonton Oilers brought their American Hockey League franchise to the Alberta capital during the 2004–05 NHL lockout season.  The team was suspended following the resumption of the NHL, and was eventually reformed as the Oklahoma City Barons. The Calgary Wranglers, the AHL affiliate of the Calgary Flames, play at the same arena.

Western Hockey League
The professional Western Hockey League was formed following a merger with the Pacific Coast Hockey League and the Western Canada Senior Hockey League.  Both Alberta franchises lost their amateur status when they joined the new league.

Junior

Western Hockey League
The Major-Junior Western Hockey League was formed in 1966 to strengthen junior hockey in the west.  The Calgary Buffaloes were the only expansion team, as the other six founding members defected from existing leagues.

Current teams

Former teams

*The Oil Kings' two Memorial Cups predate the WHL.

Alberta Junior Hockey League
The Junior A Alberta Junior Hockey League was founded to improve the level of junior hockey in Alberta, motivated by the dominance of the Edmonton Oil Kings in the early 1960s.

Junior B hockey leagues

Junior C hockey leagues

Junior female

The Alberta Junior Female Hockey League was founded in 2009 to promote female junior hockey for players aged 18–21 in Alberta. The league has grown from its original 6 team to 10 teams throughout the province.

Semi-professional, senior and amateur

Women's hockey teams
Both of Alberta's elite women's teams were invited to join the National Women's Hockey League (NWHL) in 2002.  In 2004, they broke away to form the Western Women's Hockey League (WWHL) due to the lack of competition in the west.  They returned to the NWHL in 2006 following a merger between the two leagues. However, due to circumstances arising over scheduling between the WWHL and the NWHL, the merger was never completed. This, coupled with the collapse of the NWHL in 2007, left the Oval X-Treme and Chimos as members of the WWHL. The league announced on April 19, 2011, that it would merge with the Canadian Women's Hockey League (CWHL) for the 2011–12 season. The merger was to feature one team based in Edmonton and Calgary and is a combination of the former WWHL franchises, the Edmonton Chimos and Strathmore Rockies, with games in various locations around Alberta.  In August 2011, the WWHL announced that there had never officially been a merger and that the WWHL would continue to compete against the CWHL, but the WWHL never played another game. Team Alberta commenced play in the CWHL in 2011 before taking on the identity of the Calgary Inferno in 2013. The CWHL and the Inferno ceased operations in 2019.

Senior
Several teams from Alberta have gone on to capture the Allan Cup, Canada's national senior championship.

University
The Canada West Universities Athletic Association was founded in 1919, representing schools across Western Canada.

College
The Alberta Colleges Athletics Conference organizes sport at the collegiate level.

League, regional and national championships
Teams from Alberta have captured titles at all levels of hockey.

†Includes Calgary's 1926-27 title after league renamed itself the Prairie Hockey League
‡Does not include win by Lloydminster Border Kings as team is primarily based in Saskatchewan

See also

Hockey Alberta
Ice hockey at the 1988 Winter Olympics
Ice hockey in Calgary

References

Alberta
 
Ice hockey teams
Ice hockey teams in Alberta